Rhinotyphlops is a genus of blind snakes in the family Typhlopidae. The genus is found in Africa, the Middle East, and India. Some species formerly assigned to the genus Rhinotyphlops have been moved to the genera Afrotyphlops and Letheobia.

Species

*) Not including the nominate subspecies.
T) Type species.

References

External links
 

Typhlopidae
Snake genera
Taxa named by Leopold Fitzinger
Taxonomy articles created by Polbot